Lists of LGBT people include:

LGBT people by demographic 
List of gay, lesbian or bisexual people
List of bisexual people
List of transgender people
List of people with non-binary gender identities
List of pansexual people
List of people who identify as sexually fluid
List of intersex people
List of cross-dressers
List of androgynous people

By ethnicity or religion
 List of LGBT African Americans
 List of LGBT Jews
 List of LGBT Catholics

By location
 List of LGBT people from New York City
 List of LGBT people from Chicago
 List of LGBT people from London
 List of LGBT people from San Francisco
 List of LGBT people from Seattle
 List of LGBT people from Portland, Oregon

Politicians
 List of LGBT members of the United States Congress
 List of LGBT heads of government
 List of LGBT holders of political offices in the Netherlands
 List of LGBT politicians in Canada
 List of LGBT politicians in the United Kingdom
 List of LGBTI holders of political offices in Australia
 List of the first LGBT holders of political offices
 List of the first LGBT holders of political offices in Canada
 List of the first LGBT holders of political offices in the United Kingdom
 List of the first LGBT holders of political offices in the United States

Entertainers
 List of LGBTQ artists
 List of LGBT Academy Award winners and nominees
 List of LGBT sportspeople
 List of LGBT writers
 List of LGBT YouTubers

Others
 List of LGBT state supreme court justices
 List of LGBT ambassadors of the United States

See also
 List of LGBT-related suicides
 List of same-sex married couples
 List of LGBT rights activists